Carlo P. Basile (born June 29, 1971 in East Boston) is an American politician. Basile is currently a Consultant at the Boston-based law firm Smith, Costello, and Crawford.

Career
A native of East Boston, Basile graduated from Savio Preparatory High School and then moved on to Suffolk University, where he earned a Bachelor of Science in Criminal Justice. He served in the Massachusetts House of Representatives from 2007-2015. In 2015, Basile was named Deputy Chief of Staff for the administration of Massachusetts Governor Charlie Baker.

See also
 2007–2008 Massachusetts legislature
 2009–2010 Massachusetts legislature
 2011–2012 Massachusetts legislature
 2013–2014 Massachusetts legislature

References

External links
Commonwealth of Massachusetts profile
Carlo P. Basile Papers at the State Library of Massachusetts

1971 births
Living people
American people of Italian descent
Democratic Party members of the Massachusetts House of Representatives
People from East Boston, Boston
Suffolk University alumni